Calligrapha vicina is a species of leaf beetle in the family Chrysomelidae. It is found in North America and India.

References

Further reading

External links

 

Chrysomelinae
Articles created by Qbugbot
Beetles described in 1933